Kopanica is a village in the municipality of Saraj, North Macedonia.

Geography
The village is located in the middle of Zeden Mountain and Ljubin hills, with an elevation between 400 and 500 A.S.L.. The climate is continental and characterized by cold and wet winters (with temperatures into the -20s as seen in January 2017) and very hot and dry summers.

The village is separated into two regions, one located in the slopes of Ljubin hills and the other in the slopes of Zeden . The Ljubin hills are considered richer than the Zeden Mountain because of its dense forestry and wet lands. On the other hand, the Zeden mountain is known for its dry and non-forested lands littered with rocky areas. The Ljubin hills are known for its low elevated hills between 300-600 (the low is in Vardar river and the high in Ljubin head) meters A.S.L., with Zeden Mountain measured between 300-1264 (the lowest peak is in Vardar river and the highest peak Big Stone) meters A.S.L.

Demographics
According to the 2021 census, the village had a total of 1.790 inhabitants. Ethnic groups in the village include:

Albanians  1.761
Others 29

References

External links

Villages in Saraj Municipality
Albanian communities in North Macedonia